Clay Myers may refer to:

 H. Clay Myers Jr. (1927–2004), American politician in Oregon
 Clay Myers (photographer), American photographer, videographer and animal welfare advocate